This is a partial repertoire list of classical works for saxophone.

Saxophone and orchestra

Soprano saxophone and orchestra
 Duo Concertante, for soprano and alto saxophones—Jean-Baptiste Singelée (1858)
 Fantasia for soprano (or tenor) saxophone, three horns, and strings (1948)—Heitor Villa-Lobos
 Concerto for Soprano Saxophone and Strings, Op. 344 (1980)—Alan Hovhaness
 Where the Bee Dances, concerto for soprano saxophone and orchestra (1991)—Michael Nyman
 Concerto for Soprano Saxophone and Orchestra (1993)—Michael Torke
 Your Rockaby for soprano saxophone and orchestra (1993)—Mark-Anthony Turnage
 Double Concerto for Saxophone, Cello and Orchestra (1997)—Michael Nyman
 Saxophone Concerto No. 1: Imagined Sound of Sun On Stone (1999)—Sally Beamish
 Saxophone Concerto, for soprano saxophone and chamber orchestra (2003)—Avner Dorman
 Saxophone Concerto ("Albireo Mode"), Op. 93 for soprano saxophone and orchestra (2004–2005)—Takashi Yoshimatsu
 Concerto for soprano saxophone and orchestra (2007)—Jennifer Higdon
 Concerto after Tchaikovsky for soprano saxophone and orchestra (2013)—David DeBoor Canfield
 Concerto for soprano saxophone and chamber orchestra (2014–15)—Kalevi Aho
 Soprano Saxophone Concerto (2019) - Carter Pann

Alto saxophone and orchestra
Duo Concertante for soprano and alto saxophone—Jean-Baptiste Singelée (1858)
Divertissement espagnol—Charles Martin Loeffler (1900)
Rhapsody for orchestra and saxophone (1901)—Claude Debussy
Concerto No. 1, for alto saxophone—Paul Gilson (1902)
Concerto No 2, for alto saxophone—Paul Gilson (1902)
 Légende, symphonic suite for chromatic harp, alto saxophone and strings (1903)–André Caplet
Choral varié, Op. 55 (1903)—Vincent d'Indy
Légende, Op. 66 (1918)—Florent Schmitt
Concerto in E major for alto saxophone (1934)—Alexander Glazunov
Saxophone Concerto, Op. 14 (1934)—Lars-Erik Larsson
Concertino da camera (1935)—Jacques Ibert
Saxo Rhapsody (1936)—Eric Coates
Scaramouche for alto saxophone (1937)—Darius Milhaud
Ballade for Saxophone and Orchestra (1938)—Frank Martin
Ballade for alto saxophone (1939)—Henri Tomasi
Slawische Rhapsodie, Op. 23, for orchestra and saxophone obbligato (1940)—Viktor Ullmann
Sonata in C for alto saxophone and orchestra (1943)—Fernande Decruck
Concerto for alto saxophone and orchestra (1944)—Paul Bonneau
Concerto for alto saxophone and orchestra (or band), Op. 26 (1944)—Paul Creston
Concerto for alto saxophone (1949)—Henri Tomasi
Tableaux de Provence (1948–1955)—Paule Maurice
Saxophone Concerto, for alto saxophone and orchestra (1951)—Henk Badings
Concerto for alto saxophone, trumpet and string orchestra (1955)—Jean Rivier
Concerto for alto saxophone in E-flat major (1956)—Ronald Binge
Saxophone Concerto (1958)—Erland von Koch
Concerto for alto saxophone (1959)—Pierre Max Dubois
Élégie et rondeau for Alto Saxophone and Orchestra (1961)—Karel Husa
Claremont Concerto (1962)—John Worley
Concerto for saxophone and orchestra (1963)—William Lovelock
Concerto for saxophone and orchestra (1966)—Ida Gotkovsky
Saxophone Concerto No. 2 (1973)—William Lovelock
Symphony No. 16, for alto saxophone and orchestra (1979)—Allan Pettersson
Concerto for alto saxophone and chamber orchestra, Op. 41 (1980)—Robert Muczynski
Concerto for alto saxophone and orchestra (... auf den ersten Blick und ohne zu wissen...) (1980)—Esa-Pekka Salonen
Concerto for alto saxophone and orchestra (1983)—Ronald Caltabiano
Concerto for alto saxophone and orchestra (1983)—Gunther Schuller
Saxophone Concerto, for alto saxophone and chamber orchestra (1984)—Dominic Muldowney
Concerto for alto saxophone and orchestra—Nikolai Kapustin
Saxophone Concerto, for alto saxophone and strings (1988)—Richard Rodney Bennett
Concerto for alto saxophone and string orchestra (1989)—Nicola LeFanu
Sinfonia concertante: Symphony No. 3, for alto (or soprano) saxophone and orchestra (1989/2010)—Anders Eliasson
Concerto for alto saxophone and orchestra (1990)—Miklós Maros
Concerto for alto saxophone and string orchestra (1993)—Krzysztof Meyer
Music for alto saxophone and orchestra (1993/95)—Bertold Hummel
Cyber Bird Concerto, for alto saxophone and orchestra, Op. 59 (1994)—Takashi Yoshimatsu
My Assam Dragon for alto saxophone and orchestra (1994/1996)—Jan Sandström
Chamber Symphony No. 3 for alto saxophone and 20 string instruments(1995–96)—Kalevi Aho
Concerto for saxophone and Orchestra (1998/99)—Toshio Hosokawa
Dem Licht entgegen for alto saxophone and orchestra (2001)—Sunleif Rasmussen
Escapades (2002)—John Williams
Concerto for alto (soprano) saxophone and string orchestra (2003/2010)—Anders Eliasson
Concerto No. 2 for alto saxophone and Strings (2004)—Miklós Maros
Kotekan for alto saxophone and Strings (2006)—Piet Swerts
Saxophone Concerto No. 2: Under the Wing of the Rock for alto saxophone and strings (2006/2008)—Sally Beamish
Concerto after Glière for alto saxophone and orchestra (2007)—David DeBoor Canfield
Concerto for alto saxophone and chamber orchestra (2008)—Joan Albert Amargós
Concerto for alto saxophone and orchestra (or wind ensemble) (2010)—Thomas Sleeper
Rhapsody for alto Saxophone and Orchestra (2010)—André Waignein
Saxophone Concerto No. 1, for alto saxophone and orchestra (2012)—Henry Kelder
Hemke Concerto "Prisms of Light" for alto saxophone and orchestra (2014)—Augusta Read Thomas
Concerto for alto saxophone and orchestra (2013)—John Adams
 Concerto for alto saxophone and  orchestra opus 70b (2015)—Nimrod Borenstein
Saxophone Concerto No. 2, for alto saxophone and string orchestra (2015)—Henry Kelder
Concerto for alto saxophone and orchestra (2018)—Karol Beffa
Rush concerto for Alto Saxophone and Orchestra (2018)—Kenneth Fuchs
Concerto for alto saxophone and orchestra (1987) - Volodymyr Runchak

Tenor saxophone and orchestra
 Suite No. 1 for tenor saxophone and strings (1963)—Alec Wilder
 Suite No. 2 for tenor saxophone and strings (1966)—Alec Wilder
 Concerto for tenor saxophone and chamber orchestra (1968)—Alec Wilder
 Chant premier, Op. 103, sonata for tenor saxophone and orchestra (1974)—Marcel Mihalovici
 Concerto for tenor saxophone and orchestra (1984)—Robert Ward
 The Upward Stream concerto for tenor saxophone and orchestra (or symphonic band, or piano) (1985)—Russell Peck
 Concerto for Stan Getz, for tenor saxophone and orchestra (1990)—Richard Rodney Bennett
 Concerto for tenor saxophone and orchestra (1992)—Eric Ewazen
 Concerto for tenor saxophone and orchestra with piano obbligato (2007)—David DeBoor Canfield
 "Graffiti Play", concerto for Tenor Saxophone, contemporary Jazz Trio (ts, bs, drs) & chamber orchestra (2014)—Esa Pietilä
 Concerto for tenor saxophone and small orchestra (2015)—Kalevi Aho

Baritone saxophone and orchestra
 Rhapsody for Baritone Saxophone and Orchestra (or Wind Orchestra, or Piano) (1983)—Mark Watters
 Concerto for Baritone Saxophone and String Orchestra (1992)—Werner Wolf Glaser
 Concertino for Solo Baritone Saxophone and Orchestra (1996)—Robert Nelson
 ...and dispel the miseries of the world concerto for baritone saxophone and chamber orchestra (2007–2008)—David Gaines
 Concerto for Baritone Saxophone and Orchestra (2008)—Georg Friedrich Haas
 Vongole ! for E Baritone Saxophone and Concert Band (2015)—Satoshi Yagisawa
 Jeru Concerto for E Baritone Saxophone and Chamber Orchestra (2017)—Brian Landrus

Saxophone quartet and orchestra
 Concerto Sinfonico for Saxophone Quartet and Orchestra (1985)—Nicolas Flagello
 Concerto for Saxophone Quartet and Orchestra (1986)—Tristan Keuris
 Concerto Grosso for Saxophone Quartet and Orchestra (1988)—Miklós Maros
 Concierto a cuatro for Saxophone Quartet and Orchestra (1990)—Cristóbal Halffter
 Concerto for Saxophone Quartet and Orchestra (1991)—Michael Nyman 
 Concerto for Saxophone Quartet and Orchestra (1992)—Charles Wuorinen
 Concerto for Saxophone Quartet and Orchestra (1995)—Philip Glass
 Concerto Grosso for Saxophone Quartet and Orchestra (or Band) (2000)—William Bolcom
 Concerto for Saxophone Quartet and Orchestra (2001)—Michael Nyman
 Animal, Vegetable, Mineral for Saxophone Quartet and Orchestra (2004)—Steven Mackey
 Water Music  for Saxophone Quartet and Chamber Orchestra (2004)—Brett Dean
 Concerto for Saxophone Quartet and Strings (2007)—Sally Beamish
 Kellot / Bells  – Concerto for Saxophon Quartet and Orchestra (2008)—Kalevi Aho
 Four Preludes for saxophone quartet and string orchestra with percussion, Opus 63 (2015)—Fazıl Say
 Violet Winds concerto for saxophone quartet and chamber orchestra (2015)—Peeter Vähi

Saxophone and concert band

Soprano saxophone and concert band
 Saxophone Concerto for soprano saxophone and wind ensemble (1993)—Michael Torke
 Concerto for Soprano Saxophone and Band (1995)—Aldo Rafael Forte
 Concerto for Soprano Saxophone and Wind Ensemble (2007)—John Mackey
 Apollo for Soprano Saxophone and Wind Ensemble (2008)—Brian Balmages
 Concerto for Soprano Saxophone and Concert Band (2014)—Lewis Porter
 Concerto for Soprano Saxophone and Band (2015)—William Bolcom

Alto saxophone and concert band

 Concerto for alto saxophone and band (1902)—Paul Gilson
 Concerto, Op. 26, for alto saxophone and band (or orchestra) (1941)—Paul Creston
 Diversion for alto saxophone and band (1943)—Bernhard Heiden
 Concerto for alto saxophone and wind orchestra (1949/1953)—Ingolf Dahl
 Rhumba for alto saxophone and band (1949)—Maurice Whitney
 Introduction and Samba for alto saxophone and band (1950)—Maurice Whitney
 Ballade for Solo Eb Alto saxophone and Band (1956)—Alfred Reed
 Concerto for E-flat alto saxophone and Band (1966)—Frank William Erickson
 Concerto No. 1 for alto saxophone and Band (or Piano) (1966)—Walter Hartley
 Concerto for alto saxophone and wind ensemble (1966)—Alec Wilder
 Concerto for alto saxophone and Band (1967)—Karel Husa
 Fantasy for alto saxophone and concert band (1970?)—Noah Klauss
 Concertino for alto saxophone and wind ensemble (1971)—Warren Benson
 Concertino for alto saxophone and band (1974)—Jerry Bilik
 Miscellanies for alto saxophone and wind band (1976)—Gordon Jacob
 Heater: Saga for alto saxophone and band (1977)—William Albright
 Fantasia for alto saxophone (1984)—Claude T. Smith
 Danza Capriccio for alto saxophone and band (1985)—Ron Nelson
 Panic: A Dithyramb for alto saxophone, drum kit, winds, brass and percussion (1995)—Harrison Birtwistle
 Carnival for alto saxophone and concert band (1997)—Philip Sparke
 Concert-Suite for solo E alto saxophone and band (1998)—William Bolcom 
 Die Heldenzeit, Concerto for alto saxophone and wind ensemble (1998)—Jun Nagao 
 Concerto for alto saxophone and wind ensemble (1999)—David Maslanka
 Arioso and Presto, Op. 108, for alto saxophone and band (2001)—James Barnes
 Martyrs for the Faith, Concerto for alto saxophone and symphonic winds (2003)—David DeBoor Canfield
 Elevator Music for alto saxophone and band (2013)—David DeBoor Canfield
 Concerto after Gliere for alto saxophone and band (2009)—David DeBoor Canfield
 Concerto Agrariana for alto saxophone and band (2003)—John Cheetham
 Concerto for alto saxophone and wind ensemble (2003)—Charles Rochester Young
 Concertino for alto Saxophone and Wind Ensemble (2004)—Zechariah Goh
 Dance of Uzume for Alto Saxophone and Symphonic Band (2004)—Piet Swerts
 Fantasia for alto saxophone and band (2011)—Eric Ewazen 
 Concerto for alto saxophone and wind ensemble (2013)—Zechariah Goh 
 Concerto for alto saxophone and wind ensemble (2014)—Steven Bryant 
 Concerto for saxophone and wind ensemble (2014)—Frank Ticheli
 Fellini (for Alto Saxophone, Circus Band and Wind Orchestra) (2016)—Johan de Meij
 'Break a Reed!': Concerto for Alto Saxophone and Wind Ensemble (2022)—Mitchell T. Gilly

Tenor saxophone and concert band
 Fragments for tenor saxophone and band (1967)—William Duckworth 
 Concertino for tenor saxophone and band (or piano) (1978)—Walter Hartley
 Concerto for tenor saxophone and orchestra (transcription) (1984)—Robert Ward
 Jigsaw for tenor saxophone and band (1992)—Jack Stamp

Baritone saxophone and concert band
 Concerto for baritone saxophone and wind orchestra (2007)—Bernard van Beurden 
 Vongole! for solo baritone saxophone and concert band (2013)—Satoshi Yagisawa
 Rhapsody for baritone saxophone (2014)—Mark Watters

Saxophone quartet and concert band
 Capriccio for saxophone quartet and band (1988)—Warren Barker 
 And the Winds Shall Blow for saxophone quartet, winds and percussion (1994)—Wayne Peterson
 Urban Requiem for saxophone quartet and wind ensemble (1995)—Michael Colgrass
 Dialogues for saxophone quartet, winds, and percussion (2006)—James Curnow
 Windings for saxophone quartet and wind orchestra (2006)—Miklós Maros
 Concerto for saxophone quartet and wind ensemble (2012)—David Maslanka
 Concerto after Dvorak (2018)—David DeBoor Canfield
 Concerto for saxophone quartet and wind ensemble (2019)—Roger Briggs

Others
 Trio Concertino, for alto, tenor, and baritone saxophones and band (or piano) (1999)—Walter Hartley
 Saxophone Concertino, for saxophone (doubling on both alto and soprano) and wind orchestra (2009)—Satoshi Yagisawa
 Mystic Quest, concerto for saxophone (doubling on both alto and soprano) and wind ensemble (2013)—Satoshi Yagisawa

Saxophone and piano

Soprano saxophone and piano
 Caprice, Op. 80, for Soprano Saxophone and Piano (1862)—Jean-Baptiste Singelée
 Diversions for soprano saxophone and piano (1986)—Charles Rochester Young
 Sonata for Soprano Saxophone and Piano (1987)—Charles Rochester Young
 Sonata for Soprano Saxophone in B-flat and Piano (1989)—Jindřich Feld
 Sonata Aragon for soprano saxophone and piano (1989) – Dave Smith
 Double Vision for soprano saxophone and piano (1993)—Charles Rochester Young
 Accompanied Recitative for Soprano Saxophone and Piano (1994)—Milton Babbitt
 Sonata for Soprano Saxophone and Piano (1994)—Richard Rodney Bennett
 Vocalise for Soprano Saxophone and Piano (1994)—Bertold Hummel
 Lost in Translation for soprano saxophone and piano (2005)—Dorothy Hindman
 Fanfares for soprano saxophone and piano (2006)—Huw Watkins
 Sonata for Soprano Saxophone and Piano (2006–2007)—David DeBoor Canfield
 ZBOP! for soprano saxophone and piano (2007)—Henry Kelder
 Für Walter for soprano saxophone and piano, percussion ad libitum (2010)—Toshio Hosokawa

Alto saxophone and piano
 Caprice et Variations for Alto Saxophone and Piano (1860)—Jean-Baptiste Arban
 Fantasie sur un theme original (1860)—Jules Demersseman
 Solo de Concert (no. 1), Op. 74 for Alto Saxophone and Piano (1860)—Jean-Baptiste Singelée
 Concertino, Opus 78 for Alto Saxophone and Piano (1861)—Jean-Baptiste Singelée
 Solo de Concert No. 5, Op. 91 for Alto Saxophone and Piano (1863)—Jean-Baptiste Singelée
 Solo de Concours Op. 13 for Alto Saxophone and Piano (1874)—Paul Agricole Génin
 Le Val Fleuri (1888)—Louis Ganne
 Hot-Sonate (1930)—Erwin Schulhoff
 Sonata for Alto Saxophone and Piano (1931)—Wolfgang Jacobi
 Suite for Alto Saxophone and Piano (1935)—Paul Dessau 
 Aria for alto saxophone and piano (1936)—Eugène Bozza
 Sonata for Alto Saxophone and Piano (1937)—Bernhard Heiden
 Etudes (15) for Saxophone and Piano, Op. 188 (1942)—Charles Koechlin
 Sonata in C minor, for alto saxophone and piano (1943)—Fernande Decruck
 Sonata for Alto Horn (or Alto Saxophone) and Piano (1943)—Paul Hindemith
 Sonata, Op. 19 for Alto Saxophone and Piano (1944)—Paul Creston
Sonatina for Alto Saxophone and Piano (1953) – Lex van Delden
 Prélude, cadence et finale (1956)—Alfred Desenclos
 Sonata for Alto Saxophone (1960)—Alec Wilder
 Cinq danses exotiques (1961)—Jean Françaix
 Sonatina for Alto Saxophone and Piano (1969/95)—Bertold Hummel
 Sonata for Alto Saxophone (1970)—Edison Denisov
 Sonata for Alto Saxophone and Piano, Op. 29 (1970)—Robert Muczynski
 Variations on a Dorian Theme for alto saxophone and piano (1972)—Gordon Jacob
 Four Moods for Alto Saxophone and Piano (1975)—Phil Woods
 Sonata for Alto Saxophone and Piano (1979)—John Worley
 Albanian Summer (1980)—Dave Smith
 Divertimento (1982)—Charles Wuorinen
 Pequeña Czarda (1982)—Pedro Iturralde
Picnic on the Marne (1983)—Ned Rorem
 Sonata for Alto Saxophone and Piano (1984)—William Albright
 Sonata for Alto Saxophone and Piano (1984) David Diamond
 Poem for Alto Saxophone and Piano(1986)—Anders Eliasson
 Whirled Series (1987)—Milton Babbitt
 Keening for Alto saxophone and Piano (1987)—Michael Berkeley
 Sonata for Alto Saxophone and Piano (1988)—David Maslanka
 Novella for alto saxophone and piano (1991)—Howard J. Buss
 Sonata brevis for Alto Saxophone and Piano (1991)—Bertold Hummel
 Chant (1991)—Augusta Read Thomas
 Fuzzy Bird Sonata for Alto Saxophone and Piano (1991)—Takashi Yoshimatsu
 Sonate for Alto Saxophone and Piano (1993)—Jindřich Feld
 Vocalise for Alto Saxophone and Piano (1994)—Bertold Hummel
 Hidden Reflections (1996)—Lior Navok
 Three Piece Suite for alto saxophone and piano (1998)—Richard Rodney Bennett
 Sonata for Alto Saxophone and Piano (2000)—David DeBoor Canfield
 Sonata after Poulenc for Alto Saxophone and Piano (2013)—David DeBoor Canfield
 Ragtime Sonata after Joplin for Alto Saxophone and Piano (2013)—David DeBoor Canfield
 Sonata for Alto Saxophone (2000)—Jack Cooper
 Sonata for alto saxophone (or clarinet) and piano (2004)—Julian Wagstaff
 Sonata No. 1 for alto saxophone and piano (2007)—Brian Vlasak
 Quest for Alto Saxophone and Piano (2008)—Gilad Hochman

Tenor saxophone and piano
 Concerto, Op. 57, for Tenor Saxophone and Piano (1858)—Jean-Baptiste Singelée
 Adagio et rondo, Opus 63 for Tenor Saxophone and Piano (1861)—Jean-Baptiste Singelée
 Solo de concert No. 4, Opus 84 for Tenor Saxophone and Piano (1862)—Jean-Baptiste Singelée
 Solo de concert No. 6, Opus 92 for Tenor Saxophone and Piano (1863)—Jean-Baptiste Singelée
 Premier Solo andante et bolero for tenor saxophone and piano (1866)—Jules Demersseman
 Sonata for Tenor Saxophone and Piano (1967)—James Di Pasquale
 Sonatina for Tenor Saxophone and Piano (1969/95)—Bertold Hummel
 Sonata for Tenor Saxophone and Piano (1974)—Walter Hartley
 Sonata for Tenor Saxophone and Piano (1979)—William Schmidt
 September Sonata for tenor saxophone and piano (1985)—John Worley
 A Down East Sonata for tenor saxophone and piano (1993)—John Worley
 Quest for Tenor Saxophone and Piano (2008)—Gilad Hochman
 Sonata for Tenor Saxophone and Piano (2011)—David DeBoor Canfield
 Saxy for tenor saxophone and piano (2019)—Howard J. Buss

Baritone saxophone and piano
 Fantaisie, Op. 60, for Baritone Saxophone and Piano (1858)—Jean-Baptiste Singelée
 Solo de concert (No. 2), Op. 77, for Baritone Saxophone and Piano (1861)—Jean-Baptiste Singelée
 Solo de concert No. 3, Op. 83, for Baritone Saxophone and Piano (1862)—Jean-Baptiste Singelée
 Solo de concert No. 7, Op. 93, for Baritone Saxophone and Piano (1863)—Jean-Baptiste Singelée
 Little Suite for Baritone saxophone and piano (1974)—Walter Hartley
 Big Fun for Baritone saxophone and piano (2012)—Dorothy Hindman
 Sonata, Op. 6, for Baritone Saxophone and Piano (1976)—Garland Anderson
 Sonata for Baritone Saxophone and Piano (1976)—Walter Hartley
 Rhapsodie for Baritone Saxophone and Piano (1988)—Harald Genzmer
 Sonata for Baritone Saxophone and Piano (2008)—David DeBoor Canfield
 Duo for Baritone Saxophone and Piano (2008)—Walter Hartley

Saxophone, piano and percussion

See List of compositions for saxophone, piano and percussion

Cyberbird Concerto, trio reduction – Yoshimatsu Takashi

Saxophone quartet
 Premier Quatuor, Op. 53 (1857)—Jean-Baptiste Singelée
 Quartet (1879)—Caryl Florio
 Saxophone Quartet in B Op. 109 (1932)—Alexander Glazunov
 Introduction et variations sur une ronde populaire (1934)—Gabriel Pierné
 Petit Quatuor pour saxophones (1935) Jean Françaix
 Andante et scherzo for Saxophone Quartet (1938)—Eugène Bozza
 Quartet for Saxophones, Op. 102 (1939)—Florent Schmitt
 Quartet for Saxophones (1956)—Pierre Max Dubois
 Quartet for Saxophones (1963)—Alfred Desenclos
 Saxophone Quartet (1963)—Alec Wilder
 Quartet (1969)—Guy Lacour
 Saxophone Quartet No. 1 (1973)—Gordon Jacob
 Variations on a Theme of Stravinsky (1974)—Bernard Hoffer
 Drift (2002)—Dorothy Hindman
 Drastic Measures (1976)—Russell Peck
 Light and Shadow (1978)—Robert Starer
 Line Drawing after Mark Tobey (1978)—Samuel Alder
 Suite for Saxophone Quartet (1979)—Paul Creston
 Saxophone Quartet No. 2 (1979)—Gordon Jacob
 Quartet for Saxophones (1984)—Werner Wolf Glaser
 Quartet for Saxophones (1984)—Miklós Maros
 Music for Saxophones (1986)—Tristan Keuris
 XAS (1987)—Iannis Xenakis
 Back Burner (1989)—Frank Ticheli
 Music for four Saxophones (1990)—Bertold Hummel
 Four5 (1991)—John Cage
 Fractal (1991)—Cristóbal Halffter
 From My Diary (1992)—Branko Lazarin
 Saxophone Quartet (1992)—Charles Wuorinen
 Lamentatio (1992)—Erkki-Sven Tüür
 Saxophone Quartet No.1 – Roads to Ixtlan (1992–93)—Per Nørgård
 Saxophone Quartet No. 2 – Viltir Svanir (Wild Swans) (1994)—Per Nørgård
 Saxophone Quartet (1994)—Richard Rodney Bennett
 Saxophone Quartet No.3 – Dansere omkring Jupiter (Dancers around Jupiter) (1995)—Per Nørgård
 Variations (On Several Lines by Amy Clampitt (1995)—Sidney Corbett
 Short Stories (1995)—Jennifer Higdon
 4our Dedicated to Stockholm Saxophone Quartet (2016)—Arshia Samsaminia
 July (1995)—Michael Torke
 American Sketches for saxophone quartet (1996)—Aldo Rafael Forte
 Windup (1996)—Wayne Peterson
 Mountain Roads (1997)—David Maslanka
 Saxophone Quartet (1999)—Lior Navok
 Rise (2001)—Steven Bryant 
 Out of the Blue (2001)—Frank Ticheli
 24 Hour Sax Quartet (2004)—Michael Nyman
 Dry Bones (2005)—Howard J. Buss
 Market Forces (2005)—Eric Moe
 Fireworks (2011)—Karol Beffa
 Steamboat (2014)—Michael Daugherty

Saxophone and choir
 Galgenlieder (Gallows Songs) for Saxophone Quartet and Choir (2014)—Lera Auerbach
 Galgenlieder (Gallows Songs)  for Saxophone Quartet and Children Choir (2015)—Lera Auerbach
 I Saw Eternity for Soprano Saxophone and TTBB Choir (2012)—Paul Mealor
 Making or Breaking for Soprano Saxophone and SSAATTBB Choir (2015)—Kim André Arnesen
 Sacred Light for Soprano Saxophone and TTBB Choir (2012)—Ola Gjeilo
 Amao omi for Saxophone Quartet and Choir - Giya Kancheli

Saxophone: other chamber works
 Quintet for 2 soprano saxophones, alto saxophone, tenor saxophone, and baritone saxophone (1861)—Jerome Savari
 Impressions d’automne, Elegy for alto saxophone, oboe, 2 clarinets, basson, harp, organ and 2 cellos (1905)–André Caplet
 Quartet, for clarinet, tenor saxophone, piano and violin, Op.22 (1928–1930)—Anton Webern
 Konzertstück for two alto saxophones (1933)—Paul Hindemith
 Canonic Suite for four alto saxophones (1939)—Elliott Carter
 Quiet City for trumpet, alto saxophone, B clarinet (doubling bass clarinet), and piano (1939)—Aaron Copland
 Quartet No. 1 for Trumpet, Tenor Saxophone, Piano and Percussion (1950/1954)—Stefan Wolpe
 All Set for alto saxophone, tenor saxophone, trumpet, trombone, bass, piano, vibraphone, and percussion (1957)—Milton Babbitt
 Duo Concertante for alto saxophone, soprano saxophone, and piano, Op. 55 (1858)—Jean-Baptiste Singelée
 Cantilène et danse for alto saxophone, violin, and piano (1961)—Marc Eychenne
 Suite for baritone saxophone, horn and wind quintet (1966)—Alec Wilder
 Suite for baritone saxophone, woodwind sextet, bass, and drums (1971)—Alec Wilder
 Suite for Saxophone and Guitar, Op. 291 (1976)—Alan Hovhaness 
 Saxophon for soprano saxophone & bongo, or soprano saxophone alone (1977)—Karlheinz Stockhausen
 Piccolo for saxophone with geisha bell (1977)—Karlheinz Stockhausen
 Knabenduett (Boys' Duet) for two soprano saxophones (1977)—Karlheinz Stockhausen
 Invocationes for soprano saxophone and organ (1978/1995)—Bertold Hummel
 Duo for soprano saxophone and alto saxophone (1981)—Gordon Jacob
 Quartet for flute, alto saxophone, guitar and solo percussion (1982)—Kalevi Aho
 Linker Augentanz (Left-Eye Dance) for 7 (or 11) saxophones, synthesizer and percussion (1983/90)—Karlheinz Stockhausen
 Entführung (Abduction) for soprano saxophone and electronic and concrete music (1986/2004)—Karlheinz Stockhausen
 Due a due for soprano saxophone and percussion (1987)—Bertold Hummel
 Aragonesca for soprano/alto saxophone, bass clarinet, violin and cello (1987)—Dave Smith
 To Brooklyn Bridge for 24 voices, saxophone quartet and mixed ensemble (1987–88)—Tristan Keuris
 Noel - A little christmas suite for 3 Saxophones (1989)—Bertold Hummel
 Escapade for alto saxophone and four percussion (1991)—Howard J. Buss
 Pit Band for alto saxophone, bass clarinet, and piano (1993)—William Albright
 Quintet for alto saxophone, bassoon, viola, violoncello and double bass (1994) – Kalevi Aho
 Impromptu for soprano saxophone and marimba (1994)—Howard J. Buss
 In Erwartung (В ожидании) for saxophone quartet and six percussionists (1994)—Sofia Gubaidulina
 Quartet for tenor saxophone, violin, viola, and cello (1994)—Josef Tal
 Pictures from the Sea's Garden for saxophone and percussion (1998)—Sunleif Rasmussen
 Rough Winds Do Shake the Darling Buds for saxophone trio (1999)—Eric Moe
 Meditatio for mixed chorus and saxophone quartet (2003)—Erkki-Sven Tüür
 Verwandlung (Transformation) for trombone, saxophone quartet, cello, double bass, and tam-tam (2004)—Sofia Gubaidulina
 Walk the Walk for baritone saxophone (or bass clarinet or contrabassoon) and percussion (2005)—–Michael Daugherty
 Concerto for 22 Instruments (completed 2005)—Alistair Hinton (scored for 22 wind instruments including parts for 1 each soprano, alto, baritone and contrabass saxophones)
 Erwachen (Awakening), Nr. 92, for soprano saxophone, trumpet, and cello (2007)—Karlheinz Stockhausen
 Edentia for soprano saxophone and electronic music (2007)—Karlheinz Stockhausen
 Three Jazzicals for soprano saxophone and tuba (2009)—Howard J. Buss
 Cosmic Portraits for flute, clarinet, alto saxophone, and tenor saxophone (2009)—Howard J. Buss
 Ouroboros for saxophone sextet (2013) – Clive Strutt
 R.I.P.T. for alto saxophone and percussion (2014)—Dorothy Hindman
 Lullaby opus 81c for alto saxophone, violin and piano (2018)—Nimrod Borenstein
 Prayer without Words for soprano saxophone and harp (2018) – Gilad Hochman
 Visitations from the Dark for alto saxophone, bass clarinet, and piano (2020)—Howard J. Buss
 Sonic Tapestries for alto saxophone, violin, and piano (2020)—Howard J. Buss
 The Girl in White for soprano saxophone, trumpet, percussion, piano, violin I, violin II, viola, cello and bass (2011)—Robert J. Bradshaw
 Schizophrenia for alto sax and marimba (2011) – Shai Cohen 
 ALEA IACTA EST For alto sax, electric guitar and cello (2022) – Shai Cohen

Unaccompanied saxophone works
 Caprice En Forme De Valse (1950)—Paul Bonneau
 Improvisation et caprice for solo saxophone (1952)—Eugène Bozza
 Tre Pezzi for soprano (or tenor) saxophone (1956)—Giacinto Scelsi
 Introduction, Dance and Furioso (1959)—Herbert Couf
 Partita for alto saxophone, Op. 99x (1968)—Alois Hába
 Djiwa for solo saxophone (1971)—Laurence Wyman
 Improvisation I (1972)—Ryo Noda
 Parable XI for Alto Saxophone, Op. 123 (1972)—Vincent Persichetti
 Improvisation II & III (1975)—Ryo Noda
 Mai (1978)—Ryo Noda
 Images for Saxophones and Tape (1979)—Milton Babbitt
 Tre Pezzi for saxophone in E-flat solo (1979)—Bertold Hummel
 Sequenza IXb for Alto Saxophone (1981)—Luciano Berio
 Three Pieces (1981)—Branko Lazarin
 In Freundschaft (1982)—Karlheinz Stockhausen
 Amour for saxophone (1976/2003)—Karlheinz Stockhausen
 Getting To Know The Weather Solo Baritone Saxophone (1986)—Eve Beglarian
 A Day in the City for solo saxophone (1986)—Howard J. Buss
 Midnight Omen for solo saxophone (1986)—Howard J. Buss
 Phoenix (1988)—Ryo Noda
 Hard for tenor saxophone solo (1988)—Christian Lauba
 Sequenza VIIb for Soprano Saxophone (adaptation by Claude Delangle in 1993)—Luciano Berio
 Melodies for Saxophone (1995)—Philip Glass
 Steady Study on the Boogie (1995)—Christian Lauba
 Nine Études for Saxophones in 4 books (1996)—Christian Lauba
 Sundance for the Kid for Alto Saxophone (1998)—Laurence Wyman
 Eight Bagatelles for Soprano Saxophone (1999)—Bertold Hummel
 Le Psaume salé for saxophone solo + tape + live-electronics (2001)—Sunleif Rasmussen
 Monologue for Solo Saxophone (2003)—Gilad Hochman
 Three Episodes for Solo Saxophone (2005)—Gilad Hochman
 90 Sec for Solo Saxophone (2007)—Gilad Hochman
 Obsession for Solo Saxophone (2009)—Karol Beffa
 Phoenix Rising for Solo Soprano Saxophone (2016)—Stacy Garrop
 Post-Orientalism I for Alto saxophone (2022)—Ehsan Saboohi

External links
 http://www.tenorsaxindex.info/

References

 
Saxophone